B.E.S.T Innovation University (BESTIU), or by its full name Bharatiya Engineering Science and Technology Innovation University, is a private university located in Gownivaripaill, Gorantla in Andhra Pradesh, India.. It is recognized by University Grants Commission under Section 2(f) with the right to confer degrees as per Section 22(1) of the UGC Act, 1956. It was established in 2019.

History
BESTIU was established in 2019 under the Andhra Pradesh Private Universities (Establishment and Regulation) (Amendment) Act, 2019 which was passed in the Andhra Pradesh Legislative Assembly in February 2019 and notified later that month. The act also established Veltech University, Chittoor.

References

External links

Education in Andhra Pradesh
2019 establishments in Andhra Pradesh
Educational institutions established in 2019